Cedar Creek, Queensland may refer to:
 Cedar Creek, Queensland (Logan & Gold Coast)
 Cedar Creek, Queensland (Moreton Bay Region)